Siegmund Huber (born 22 November 1924) was an Austrian former cyclist. He competed in the individual and team road race events at the 1948 Summer Olympics.

References

External links
 

1924 births
Possibly living people
Austrian male cyclists
Olympic cyclists of Austria
Cyclists at the 1948 Summer Olympics
Place of birth missing (living people)
20th-century Austrian people